Nationality words link to articles with information on the nation's poetry or literature (for instance, Irish or France).

Events
 English poet Sir John Beaumont, 1st Baronet presented with the Beaumont Baronetcy, of Grace Dieu in the County of Leicester

Works published

Great Britain
 Michael Drayton, The Battaile of Agincourt
 Phineas Fletcher, Locustae, in Latin with English paraphrasing
 Thomas May, translator, Lucan's Pharsalia; or, The Civill Warres of Rome, between Pompey the Great, and Julius Caesar, translated from Latin, completed in 10 books (first three translated books published first in 1626; see also A Continuation 1630)
 Richard Niccols, The Beggers Ape, published anonymously

Other
 Gabriel Bocángel, Rimas ("Verses"), containing both ballads and sonnets; Spain
 Luis de Góngora (died May 24), Works in verse by the Spanish Homer, collected by Juan López de Vicuña, published posthumously; includes numerous sonnets, odes, ballads, songs for guitar, La Fábula de Polifemo y Galatea, Las Soledades and other long poems; Spain
 François de Malherbe and others, Recueil des plus beaux vers des poètes de ce temps, with many poems by Malherbe and his acknowledged disciples; France
 John of the Cross (died 1591), Spiritual Canticle, Spain, largely written in 1577, first published in its original language, in Brussels

Births
Death years link to the corresponding "[year] in poetry" article:
 Nicolò Minato (died 1698), Italian poet, librettist and impresario
 Walter Pope (died 1714), English astronomer and poet

Deaths

Birth years link to the corresponding "[year] in poetry" article:
 April 19 – John Beaumont (born 1583), English playwright and poet
 May 24 – Luis de Góngora (born 1561), Spanish lyric poet
 May 26 – Lucy Russell, Countess of Bedford (born 1581), English countess, minor poet, and major patron of poets
 July 4 (bur.) – Thomas Middleton (born 1580), English playwright and poet
 July 9 – Dirk Rafaelsz Camphuysen (born 1586), Dutch painter, poet and theologian
 October – Bernardo de Balbuena (born 1561), Spanish-born Latin American poet
 Also:
 Charles Best (born 1570), English poet, writer of A Sonnet of the Moon
 Abdul Rahim Khan-I-Khana (born 1556), Indian poet in Mughal Emperor Akbar court
 Cormac Mac Con Midhe (born unknown), Irish poet
 Thomas Seget (born 1569), Scottish poet who wrote in Latin

See also

 Poetry
 16th century in poetry
 16th century in literature

Notes

17th-century poetry
Poetry